The National Research Foundation is a foundation of the Ministry of Higher Education and Scientific Research in the United Arab Emirates. It has been designed to promote research activity in private and public universities and colleges, at centers of research in institutes and in companies, by individuals and by research teams in the United Arab Emirates.

History
In the United Arab Emirates (UAE), a National Research Foundation was created in March 2008, by a decree signed by Sheikh Nahyan bin Mubarak Al Nahyan, Minister of Higher Education & Scientific Research. The National Research Foundation is a Ministry of Higher Education & Scientific Research initiative intended to promote and coordinate research activity, to provide research leadership in the country and to provide funding support on a competitive basis to researchers based in the United Arab Emirates. In its early years, research projects that survive international peer review, that contribute social and economic benefits to the UAE and which enhance the development process in that country, have been favored.

References

External links 
 
 Full Decree

Education in the United Arab Emirates
Universities and colleges in the United Arab Emirates
Government agencies of the United Arab Emirates
Science and technology in the United Arab Emirates
Scientific organisations based in the United Arab Emirates